Stellaria testigera, common name finger carrier shell, is a species of large sea snail, a marine gastropod mollusk in the family Xenophoridae, the carrier shells.

Subspecies
 Stellaria testigera profunda Ponder, 1983
 Stellaria testigera digitata Martens, 1878

Distribution
Stellaria testigera profunda is present in the Gulf of Aden and in North East Africa, while Stellaria testigera digitata can be found in Senegal and Western Africa.

Description
These shells are characterized by the expanded peripherical flange, the presence of digitations and the smooth dorsal surface.

Fossil record
Fossils of Stellaria testigera are found in marine strata from the Miocene to Pliocene (age range: from 20.43 to 3.6 million years ago.).  Fossils are known from Italy, Denmark and Slovakia. These mollusks lived in the Mediterranean and spread to the Atlantic Africa and the Gulf of Aden.

References

 Kreipl K. & Alf A. (1999). Recent Xenophoridae. Conchbooks, Hackenheim > Germany. 148pp.

Xenophoridae
Fossil taxa described in 1831